Aeolothrips is a genus of predatory thrips in the family Aeolothripidae. There are more than 80 described species in Aeolothrips.

Species
These 89 species belong to the genus Aeolothrips:

 Aeolothrips afghanus Jenser
 Aeolothrips albicinctus Haliday, 1836
 Aeolothrips albithorax Pelikan, 1964
 Aeolothrips andalusiacus Strassen
 Aeolothrips arnebiae Priesner, 1948
 Aeolothrips asirensis
 Aeolothrips astutus Priesner, 1926
 Aeolothrips aureus Moulton, 1931
 Aeolothrips auricestus Treherne, 1919
 Aeolothrips balati Pelikan, 1958
 Aeolothrips bhattii
 Aeolothrips bicolor Hinds, 1902
 Aeolothrips bournieri Lacasa, 1983
 Aeolothrips brevicauda Hood, 1935
 Aeolothrips brevicornis Bagnall, 1915
 Aeolothrips brunneipictus Bailey, 1951
 Aeolothrips bucheti Bagnall, 1934
 Aeolothrips carpobrotus Hartwig
 Aeolothrips citricinctus Bagnall, 1933
 Aeolothrips clarus Bailey, 1951
 Aeolothrips collaris Priesner, 1919
 Aeolothrips crassus Hood, 1912
 Aeolothrips crucifer Hood, 1935
 Aeolothrips cursor Priesner, 1939
 Aeolothrips deserticola Priesner, 1929
 Aeolothrips distinctus Bhatti, 1971
 Aeolothrips duvali Moulton, 1927
 Aeolothrips eremicola (Priesner, 1938)
 Aeolothrips ericae Bagnall, 1920
 Aeolothrips fallax Strassen
 Aeolothrips fasciatus (Linnaeus, 1758)
 Aeolothrips flaviventer Pelikan, 1983
 Aeolothrips fuscus Watson, 1931
 Aeolothrips gloriosus Bagnall, 1914
 Aeolothrips guitiani Berzosa & Maroto, 1990
 Aeolothrips gundeliae Alavi, Awal, Fekrat, Minaei & Manzari, 2016
 Aeolothrips hartleyi Moulton, 1927
 Aeolothrips heinzi
 Aeolothrips hesperus Bailey, 1951
 Aeolothrips intermedius Bagnall, 1934
 Aeolothrips interruptus Bailey, 1951
 Aeolothrips kurosawai Bhatti, 1971
 Aeolothrips kuwanaii Moulton, 1907
 Aeolothrips laurencei
 Aeolothrips linarius Priesner, 1948
 Aeolothrips manteli Titschack, 1962
 Aeolothrips masflavus Priesner, 1933
 Aeolothrips melaleucus (Haliday, 1852)
 Aeolothrips melisi Priesner, 1936
 Aeolothrips metacrucifer Bailey, 1951
 Aeolothrips mexicanus Priesner, 1924
 Aeolothrips microstriatus Hood
 Aeolothrips modestus
 Aeolothrips montanus Bailey, 1951
 Aeolothrips montivagus Priesner, 1948
 Aeolothrips nasturtii Jones, 1912
 Aeolothrips neyrizi Alavi, 2017
 Aeolothrips nitidus Moulton, 1946
 Aeolothrips occidentalis Bailey, 1951
 Aeolothrips oculatus Hood, 1927
 Aeolothrips oregonus Hood, 1935
 Aeolothrips pallidicornis Hood, 1938
 Aeolothrips pandyani Ramakrishna
 Aeolothrips pelikani Titschack, 1964
 Aeolothrips priesneri Knechtel, 1923
 Aeolothrips propinquus Bagnall, 1924
 Aeolothrips pulcher von Oettingen, 1943
 Aeolothrips pyrenaicus Bagnall, 1934
 Aeolothrips quercicola Bournier, 1971
 Aeolothrips saharae
 Aeolothrips scabiosatibia Moulton, 1930
 Aeolothrips scitus
 Aeolothrips sobrinus
 Aeolothrips surcalifornianus Johansen, 1989
 Aeolothrips tauricus Derbeneva, 1959
 Aeolothrips tenuicornis Bagnall, 1926
 Aeolothrips terrestris Bailey, 1951
 Aeolothrips vehemens Hood, 1927
 Aeolothrips verbasci Knechtel, 1955
 Aeolothrips versicolor Uzel, 1895
 Aeolothrips vittatus Haliday, 1836
 Aeolothrips vittipennis Hood, 1912
 Aeolothrips walkerae Mound
 Aeolothrips wetmorei Hood, 1927
 Aeolothrips xizangengsis Han, 1986
 Aeolothrips yunnanensis Han, 1986
 Aeolothrips zurstrasseni Minaei, 2013
 † Aeolothrips extinctus Priesner & Quiévreux, 1935
 † Aeolothrips jarzembowskii Shmakov, 2014

References

Further reading

External links

 

Thrips
Thrips genera
Taxa named by Alexander Henry Haliday
Articles created by Qbugbot